The Salverda Omloop van de IJsseldelta is a women's one-day cycle race held in the Netherlands. It is rated by the Union Cycliste Internationale (UCI) as a category 1.2 race, having previously been a national-level event from 2009 to 2014.

Winners

References

External links

Women's cycle races
Cycle races in the Netherlands